Merav Michaeli (born 24 November 1966) is an Israeli politician, journalist, TV anchor, radio broadcaster, feminist, and activist. She is currently the leader of the Israeli Labor Party and was the Minister of Transport and Road Safety in the thirty-sixth government of Israel.

Biography
Michaeli was born in Petah Tikva to Ami Michaeli and Suzan Kastner, of Hungarian Jewish background. She is the granddaughter of Rudolf Kastner and also of Nehemia Michaeli who was the last secretary of the Mapam party.

During her youth, Michaeli served as leader in the Israeli Scouts. In the IDF, Michaeli was a newscaster on the Army Radio. She helped establish Galgalatz and Radio Tel Aviv radio stations and would also lead Hebrew television programs focused on politics. 

She was a journalist and opinion columnist for the Haaretz newspaper. She also taught university classes and lectured extensively on the topics of feminism, media, and communications. In September 2012, she spoke at TED Jaffa on the theme of "paradigm shift", in which she argued that society should "cancel marriage".

Political career
In October 2012 Michaeli announced that she was joining the Labor Party, and intended to run for inclusion on Labor's list for the 2013 Knesset elections. On 29 November 2012 she won fifth place on the Labor Party's list, and was elected to the Knesset when Labor won 15 seats.

In preparation for the 2015 general election the Labor and Hatnuah parties formed the Zionist Union alliance. Michaeli won the ninth slot on the Zionist Union list, and was elected to the Knesset as it won 24 seats. 

Shortly before the end of the Knesset term, the Zionist Union was dissolved, with Labor and Hatnuah sitting in the Knesset as separate parties. Michaeli was placed seventh on the Labor list for the April 2019 elections, but lost her seat as Labor was reduced to six seats. However, she returned to the Knesset in August 2019 after Stav Shaffir resigned from the legislature. On 22 April 2020 after the 2020 Israeli legislative election the then Labor party leader Amir Peretz announced that the Labor Party would join the unity government in the Netanyahu-Gantz coalition, but Michaeli rejected sitting in the coalition under Netanyahu.  

She was elected to lead the Israeli Labor Party on 24 January 2021 after her predecessor, Amir Peretz, announced he would not stand for re-election. 

In the election on 23 March 2021, the Israeli Labor Party was granted seven seats, and, during the parliamentary negotiation phase, put their trust in Yair Lapid to form the government. On 13 June 2021, the 36th Israeli government was sworn in, and with it Michaeli as Minister of Transport and Road safety. On 31 December 2021, she announced that the Central Bus Station in Tel Aviv would be closed within four years, breaking her promise to close it immediately. She gave in to the mayor of Tel Aviv, Ron Huldai, who has no intention of closing the Central Bus Station. 

Michaeli was re-elected to lead the Israeli Labor Party in July 2022.

Personal life

Her partner is the television producer, host and comedian Lior Schleien. In August 2021, Merav and Schleien's son was born in the United States by surrogate pregnancy.

References

External links

|-

1966 births
Living people
21st-century Israeli women politicians
Haaretz people
Israeli activists
Israeli feminists
Israeli Labor Party politicians
Israeli people of Hungarian-Jewish descent
Israeli radio presenters
Israeli women radio presenters
Israeli television journalists
Israeli women activists
Israeli women journalists
Israeli women's rights activists
Jewish Israeli politicians
Members of the 19th Knesset (2013–2015)
Members of the 20th Knesset (2015–2019)
Members of the 21st Knesset (2019)
Members of the 22nd Knesset (2019–2020)
Members of the 23rd Knesset (2020–2021)
Members of the 24th Knesset (2021–2022)
Members of the 25th Knesset (2022–)
Ministers of Transport of Israel
People from Petah Tikva
Women government ministers of Israel
Women members of the Knesset
Women television journalists
Zionist Union politicians
Jewish women activists